Damiano Russo (July 26, 1983 – October 21, 2011) was an Italian actor.

Biography 
Russo was born in Bari, Italy and spent part of his life in Rome.

Career 
After his film debut in 1998, in Io non ho la testa, directed by Michele Lanubile, in 1999 he starred in Tutto l'amore che c'è (All the Love There Is), directed by Sergio Rubini. This second film earned him the Capitello d'Oro award at the Sannio FilmFest and a nomination for the Italian Golden Globe film award.

In 2001 he made his debut on the small screen with the RAI TV series Compagni di scuola, and later starred in several other RAI dramas and series, including the popular soap opera Un posto al sole, and the Canale 5 film Come un delfino, the latter produced by Raoul Bova.

In 2004, he took a leading film role in Answer Me (Nel mio amore), directed by Susanna Tamaro, based on the novel by Tamaro of the same name. In 2010 in A Second Childhood (Italian: Una sconfinata giovinezza, also known as Endless Youth), directed by Pupi Avati

Death 
He died in Rome on the evening of October 21, 2011, at the age of 28, in a motorbike accident. On Sunday October 23, at Teatro Valle, in Rome, family, friends and colleagues gathered to commemorate Damiano's life and career.

Aftermath and tributes 
Ten years after his death, a garden located in the Poggiofranco neighborhood of Bari was named after Russo.

Awards and nominations 
Sannio FilmFest – Capitelli d'Oro

2000: Tutto l'amore che c'è (All the Love There Is), won.

Italian Golden Globe

2000: Tutto l'amore che c'è (All the Love There Is), nominated.

Filmography

Film 

 Io non ho la testa, directed by Michele Lanubile (1998).
 Tutto l'amore che c'è, directed by Sergio Rubini (2000).
 Answer me (Nel mio amore), directed by Susanna Tamaro (2004).
 Non te ne andare, directed by Alessandro Porzio (2009).
 Una sconfinata giovinezza (a Second Childhood), directed by Pupi Avati (2010).

Short films 

 Ice Scream.
 La rivoluzione russa.

Television 

 Compagni di scuola, directed by Tiziana Aristarco and Claudio Norza - TV series - Rai 2 (2001).
 La tassista, directed by José María Sánchez - TV series - Rai 1 (2004).
 Distretto di Polizia 5 - TV series - Canale 5 - Episode: Il giustiziere  (2005).
 Il veterinario, directed by José María Sánchez - TV series - Rai 1 (2005).
 Un posto al sole, several directors  - Soap opera - Rai 3 (2006).
 La notte breve, directed by Camilla Costanzo and Alessio Cremonini - Film TV - Rai 2 (2006).
 Medicina generale, directed by Renato De Maria - TV series - Rai 1 - Episode: Errori  (2007).
 R.I.S. 3 - Delitti imperfetti - TV series - Canale 5 - Episode: Tra la vita and la morte (2007).
 I liceali, directed by Lucio Pellegrini and Giulio Manfredonia - TV series - Joi and Canale 5  (2008).
 Distretto di Polizia 8, directed by Alessandro Capone and Matteo Mandelli - Episode: Effetti collaterali (2008).
 Così vanno le cose, directed by Francesco Bovino - Film TV - Joi (2008).
 I liceali 2, directed by Lucio Pellegrini and Francesco Amato - TV series - Joi and Canale 5 (2009).
 Come un delfino, directed by Stefano Reali (2011).
 Benvenuti a tavola - Nord vs Sud (Gourmet wars), directed by Francesco Miccichè (2012) - Episode: "Grazie dei fiori".

References 

21st-century Italian male actors
1983 births
Italian male film actors
People from Bari
2011 deaths
Male actors from Rome
20th-century Italian male actors
Italian male television actors
Road incident deaths in Italy